Franco Corleone (born 29 September 1946 in Milan) is an Italian politician.

Biography
Franco Corleone graduated in Political Science at the State University of Milan.

He became Deputy for the first time in 1982 and hel office until 1983; he returned to being a member of the Chamber of Deputies in 1986. In both cases he replaced a resigning Deputy of the Radical Party

In 1987 he was elected Senator and was a member of the Justice Commission and the Health Commission.

In 1989 he was elected MEP on the list of the Rainbow Greens, charge from which he resigned after six months to avoid double assignment.

Subsequently, he was re-elected Deputy in 1994 and 1996 among the ranks of the Federation of the Greens. He served as Undersecretary for Justice from 1996 to 2001, in the governments led by Prodi, D'Alema and Amato.

From 2003 to 2013 he held the position of Guarantor for the rights of prisoners of the Municipality of Florence. In October 2013 he was elected regional guarantor of the persons subjected to measures restricting the personal freedom of the Tuscany Region.

He is the Coordinator of the territorial guarantors for the rights of prisoners.

References

External links
personal page on the website of the Tuscany region

1946 births
Living people
Politicians from Milan
20th-century Italian politicians
21st-century Italian politicians
Radical Party (Italy) politicians
Federation of the Greens politicians